Aadu is an Estonian male given name.

Variants include Aado and Ado. All these names are variants of the names Adam and Adolf.

Some of the known bearers of this name are: 
 Aadu Birk or Ado Birk (1883–1942), Estonian politician and Prime Minister of Estonia
 Aadu Hint (1910–1989), Estonian writer
 Aadu Luukas (1939–2006), Estonian businessman
 Aadu Lüüs (1878–1967), Estonian pediatrician and medical scientist
 Aadu Must (born 1951), Estonian historian and politician

References

Aadu